Rachel Johnson (born February 5, 1991) is an American rugby union player. She plays Flanker for the United States and for Exeter Chiefs in the Premier 15s.

Johnson made her Eagles debut against New Zealand in 2018. She was named in the Eagles squad for the 2022 Pacific Four Series in New Zealand. She was selected in the Eagles squad for the 2021 Rugby World Cup in New Zealand.

Johnson has a Bachelors Degree in Community Health.

References

External links 

 Eagles Profile
 Exeter Chiefs Profile

Living people
1991 births
Female rugby union players
American female rugby union players
United States women's international rugby union players